Kıymalı is several Turkish dishes. Kıyma means minced meat, and kıymalı means contains/cooked with minced meat in Turkish. Kıyma is the source of the word keema used in the cuisines of the Indian subcontinent.
 Kıymalı pide, a Turkish flatbread with minced meat.
 Kıymalı gözleme, a Turkish pastry dish including minced meat.

References

Turkish words and phrases